Megan "Meggie" Dougherty Howard (born July 27, 1995) is an American professional soccer player who plays as a midfielder for San Diego Wave FC of National Women's Soccer League (NWSL).

Early life
Howard played soccer as a freshman and senior at St. Petersburg Catholic High School, reaching the Florida High School Athletic Association Class 2A regional final in 2013. She also played club soccer with Tampa Bay United Premier Girls 94 team, which won the 2011 and 2012 Disney Qualifier.

Florida Gators
Howard was a four-year starter for the Florida Gators at the University of Florida from 2013 to 2016 while also earning a degree in management. She totaled 89 career starts in 94 appearances and scored 14 goals, playing mostly as a holding midfielder. In 2016, Howard saw a career high in minutes, goals and assists as a senior and was recognized with All-SEC first team and All-American third team selections, and was named SEC Tournament MVP after registering an assist in each tournament match including on the match-winning golden goal in the final.

Club career
In 2015 and 2016, while still in college, Howard played for Washington Spirit Reserves in the W-League and in the Women's Premier Soccer League. With team she won the W-League title in 2015 and the Women's Premier Soccer League East Conference in 2016. In 2015, she was named to the W-League All-League Team.

Washington Spirit, 2017–2020
In 2017, Howard was selected in the third round (29th overall) of the 2017 NWSL College Draft by Washington Spirit. She was signed to the team on March 12 and made her professional debut on April 22 as a 67th minute substitute for Kristie Mewis in a 1–1 draw with Orlando Pride. She scored her first goal as a rookie on August 4, 2017, in a 4–1 victory over Sky Blue FC.

Orlando Pride, 2021–2022
On December 24, 2020, Howard was traded along with two first-round picks and $140,000 in allocation money to Orlando Pride in exchange for Emily Sonnett. She made her debut for the club on April 10, 2021, starting and assisting both goals in a 2–2 draw with Racing Louisville in the 2021 NWSL Challenge Cup opening round.

San Diego Wave FC, 2023–present
On January 12, 2023, Howard signed a two year contract as a free agent with San Diego Wave FC.

International career
In November 2011, Howard was called up to the United States under-15 team. In April 2016 she was called up to the under-23 training camp in Charlottesville, Virginia that featured only collegiate players. The following month she was part of the 20-player roster that won the U23 Nordic Tournament. In January 2017 Howard was again called up to the under-23 team, the first camp of the year that included a mixture of top players from the U.S. youth teams, elite college players and four NWSL players. It was overseen by senior team head coach Jill Ellis to evaluate players for potential senior call-ups.

Career statistics

Club
.

Honors

College
Southeastern Conference regular season: 2013, 2015
SEC Women's Soccer Tournament: 2015, 2016

Individual
USL W-League All-League team: 2015

References

External links
 Meggie Dougherty Howard at National Women's Soccer League
 Meggie Dougherty Howard at Florida Gators
 

Living people
1995 births
People from Largo, Florida
Soccer players from Florida
Sportspeople from Pinellas County, Florida
Washington Spirit players
University of Florida alumni
Florida Gators women's soccer players
American women's soccer players
Women's association football midfielders
National Women's Soccer League players
Washington Spirit draft picks
Orlando Pride players